Shur-e Bala (also Romanized as Shūr-e Bālā; also known as Shūr) is a village in Milanlu Rural District, in the Central District of Esfarayen County, North Khorasan Province, Iran. At the 2006 census, its population was 170, in 40 families.

References 

Populated places in Esfarayen County